One for the Boys may refer to:

"One for the Boys", campaign which teaches men about male cancers, chaired by Samuel L. Jackson
One for the Boys (Connie Francis album), unreleased studio album
"One for the Boys", song from Brian Wilson (album)
"One for the Boys", song by hardcore band Bane from The Note (album)

See also
One of the Boys (disambiguation)